Joel Lipinski (born July 29, 1985 in Regina, Saskatchewan) is a professional Canadian football defensive back who most recently played in 2011 with the Edmonton Eskimos of the Canadian Football League. He was signed as an undrafted free agent by the Saskatchewan Roughriders in 2009. 

Lipinski played CIS football for the Saint Mary's Huskies and Regina Rams and CJFL football for the Vancouver Island Raiders.

In 2016 Lipinski was named strength and conditioning coach to the Canada national football team.

Footnotes

1985 births
Living people
Canadian football defensive backs
Edmonton Elks players
Sportspeople from Regina, Saskatchewan
Players of Canadian football from Saskatchewan
Regina Rams players
Saint Mary's Huskies football players
Saskatchewan Roughriders players